The Camelion class was a class of screw-driven sloops of wood construction, designed by Isaac Watts and operated by the Royal Navy. Eight ships of the class were built from 1858 to 1866 with another eight cancelled. They were initially rated as second-class sloops, but were later reclassified as corvettes.

Design

Construction
A barque rig was fitted to allow easy sail handling with a relatively small crew of 180.

Propulsion
They were fitted with a two-cylinder horizontal single-expansion steam engine (although Perseus and Reindeer received single trunk steam engines) driving a single screw.

Armament
They were armed with five 40-pounder breech-loading guns and twelve 32-pounder muzzle-loading smoothbore guns, although Reindeer was completed with a single 110-pounder and five 64-pounder guns.

Ships 
The first two vessels were ordered on 3 April 1854, although neither was laid down for several years. Another three were ordered on 1 April 1857 and a further three on 27 March 1858.  The final eight ships were ordered in two batches on 5 March 1860 and 25 March 1861, but were either cancelled, or in the case of Circassian and Trent, completed as ironclad sloops under new names.

Notes

References

Citations

Bibliography

External links

Royal Navy cruisers at www.battleships-cruisers.co.uk

 
Ship classes of the Royal Navy
Sloop classes
 Camelion